Stefan "Lillis" Åkesson is a legendary Swedish Pro freestyle skateboarder. He is the founder of the International Network for Flatland freestyle Skateboarding and of Reverse Freestyle Skateboards, as well as the co-founder of the World Freestyle Skateboard Association (WFSA).

Åkesson started to skateboard in 1978 and won his first Swedish Skateboard Championships in 1983.  Won his first European Championships in 1987, the World Championships in 2000, and the European Championships once again in 2005. In 2011 he won the World Championships again.

Lillis enters contests, does demos, shows and clinics all over the world. He was part of the theater group Skokloster Teatersällskap as an lead actor and work part-time as a sales person for Stadium  and freelance as a web- and graphic designer.

He has his own pro signature model from Moonshine Skateboards .

Contest highlights
World Champion 2011, Sweden
World Champion 2000, San Francisco (tie)
European Champion 2005, England
European Champion 1987, Sweden
2nd World Championships 2008
2nd World Championships 2007
2nd World Championships 2006
2nd World Championships 2005
2nd World Championships 2001
2nd World Championships 2002
3nd World Championships 2018 Japan
1st Chit Challenge, New Jersey 2001
1st LA Barrio Games, Los Angeles 2001
1st Reverse Freestyle Open 2003
1st SKF Euro Cup 1990
1st Swedish Champion 15 times
2nd UK Round Up 2015, England 
2nd Spot On, Glendale 2008
2nd Spot On, Glendale 2009
2nd Venice Beach Jam & Contest, 2010
3rd European Championships 2021, Brandenburg, Germany
2nd Grand Prix Trocadero 2008, Paris, France
2nd Spon On Summer Classic 2008, Glendale, USA
2nd Venice Beach Contest & Jam 2010, Venice Beach, USA 
3rd All Japan Freestyle Skateboard Contest 2012, Tokyo, Japan
3rd Paderborn World Cup 2009, Paderborn, Germany
4th Stockholm Freestyle 2016, Stockholm Sweden
4th World Round Up 2012, Vancouver, Canada
5th World Round Up 2015, Vancouver, Canada
6th World Round Up 2017, Vancouver, Canada
6th World Round Up 2016, Vancouver, Canada
6th World Round Up 2013, Vancouver, Canada

Guinness World Record 2008: Most Dogwalks in 1 minute.

Guinness World Record 2006: Longest one wheelie on flat, 39 meters.
Update!:
Guinness World Record 2007: Longest one wheelie on flat, 68 meters and 54 centimeters.

Sponsors
Moonshine Skateboards 
Seismic Skate Systems

Early life
Stefan "Lillis" Åkesson was born April 21, 1964, in Falun, Sweden to Britt-Inger and Kjell Åkesson. He was raised in Falun and in 1992 moved to Idealbyn Skokloster. He has a younger brother, Peter, that lives in Thailand and work as a horseback riding instructor. Lillis has two kids and joke "they are older than me now".

Career
Lillis saw a skateboard for the first time in his life 1977 and knew that moment that he wanted to be a skateboarder. It took him however one complete year to convince his parents to buy him a skateboard. Finally, the summer of 1978, Lillis stepped on his very own skateboard. Why skateboarding attracted him he has no idea of, he just knew that it was something he had to do, something that was already a part of his life. These days he talks about the freedom, the creativity, the expression of one's self through skateboarding, integration of body and mind and pure and crazy fun. But back then in the late 1970s, it was simply his destiny. And still is.

Lillis is also an aspiring actor and was part of a local theater group, Skokloster Teatersällskap, where he trained under the guidance of Swedish actor and director Willy Tappert. Lillis has had the lead roles as Lars Hård in the play "Lars Hård" by Jan Fridegård and as Mascarille in "The Pretentious Young Ladies" by Molière and Jean in August Strindbergs "Fröken Julie".

The debut in front of the cameras was for the pilot of "1251 – Folkungarnas tid", where he is portraying the 1300th century Swedish king Knut den Långe.

Summer 2011 Lillis had one on the lead in the independent short movie Svartmunkarnas Krönika – Codex Dei, working with famous Swedish actors Per Ragnar and Kim Anderzon. Unfortunately the film got stuck inte editing room due to financial problems. Lillis is still waiting for his break ...

Being a fan of Star Trek, Lillis is happy to have landed the role as the android Commander Andrew in the Norwegian fan based Star Trek/Star Wars crossover movie Gatekeeper. Filming is scheduled somewhere in the future (hopefully not in a galaxy far away).

Lillis is also a very creative web and graphic designer. He goes to great lengths to come up with the perfect balance between form, function and simplicity. Which also shines through his skateboarding.

Lillis works part time as a sales person at the sports store Stadium in Barkarby, Stockholm.

Hobbies
Lillis enjoy daily practice of Transcendental Meditation and Bikram Yoga, which they sees as a basis for everything else he does. Some other things he does is playing miniature figure games, card games and board games and enters tournaments (such as Heroclix). Even though he does not do as well in these tournaments as in skateboarding contests, he is having fun and enjoying and love seeing how he improve the gaming bit by bit, and claim it is good for the brain. Another rather new hobby is collecting some comics from Marvel and DC.

References
 Stefan "Lillis" Åkesson web page

Swedish skateboarders
Living people
Freestyle skateboarders
1964 births